Margaret Mary "Pegi" Young (née Morton; December 1, 1952 – January 1, 2019) was an American singer, songwriter, environmentalist, educator and philanthropist.

Music career
After marrying Canadian folk rock musician Neil Young in 1978, her debut as a singer came in 1983 when she was a member of The Pinkettes, the backing vocalists on her husband's rockabilly Shocking Pinks tour. In 1994 she made her first nationwide TV appearance at the Academy Awards, singing backup on Neil's song "Philadelphia", nominated for an Oscar.

The Youngs performed together at a number of their annual Bridge School Benefit Concerts. Young joined her then husband on his 2000 tour as a backup singer.

In 2007, after recording songs in her home studio at the Broken Arrow Ranch, she released her self-titled debut album. Young followed it with the  albums Foul Deeds (2010), and Bracing for Impact (2011). She toured and performed with her band The Survivors, which includes Spooner Oldham on piano, Rick Rosas on bass, Kelvin Holly on guitar and drummer Phil Jones.

Philanthropy
In 1986, Pegi Young co-founded the Bridge School, an educational program aimed at serving the needs of children with severe physical and speech impairments.

Young was inspired to create the school based on her experiences with her son Ben, who was born with cerebral palsy, a congenital condition that can be influenced by hereditary factors. For Ben, the condition resulted in severe speech difficulties and motor impairment. Pegi and her husband said they searched for educational institutions tailored for children like Ben with physical and learning impairments, but were frustrated to find that none really existed.

Young founded the school with additional help from Jim Forderer, a fellow parent of a child with specialized educational needs, and Dr. Marilyn Buzolich.

Pegi and Neil raised awareness for their newly founded school with their Bridge School Benefit Concert, which ran annually from 1986 until 2016, bringing in musicians such as Arcade Fire, Mumford & Sons, Tony Bennett, Bruce Springsteen, Lucinda Williams, Jack White and Metallica. Since 1986, The Bridge School has continued to grow and evolve organically into an internationally recognized organization. Graduates from The Bridge School have often returned to their home school districts and continued their education once their rudimentary educational needs were met in the Bridge School’s more specialized setting.

She served in the capacity of Executive Director of the Bridge School for seven years, and as President of the Board of Directors since its inception in 1986 until her death. She also continued to organize and host the Bridge School Benefit concert every year since its 1986 debut.

Educational outreach
Young served on the board of A.R.T. (Artistic Realization Technologies), an organization dedicated to bringing avenues for creative expression through art into the lives of individuals with severe disabilities. She was on the Advisory Board of the “virtual” AAC-RERC and on the Advisory Council for Lemelson Assistive Technology and Design Center on the campus of Hampshire College.

Young served for four years on the board of the Alliance for Technology Access, a grassroots organization of 43 community based centers around the country serving individuals with disabilities, aimed at increasing their independence through the use of technology.

Environmentalism
Young performed at and hosted Farm Aid with her then-husband Neil in 2007 and in 2012, and, in 2013, began serving on the board of directors of Rainforest Connection, an organization aimed at preventing deforestation by using real-time data collection to maximize the effectiveness of ground enforcement.

Personal life and death
Young was born Margaret Mary Morton  in San Mateo, California, on December 1, 1952 to Thomas and Margaret Jean (Foley) Morton.

Young met future husband Neil Young in 1974 when she was working as a waitress at a diner near his ranch, a story he tells in the 1992 song "Unknown Legend". They married in August 1978 and had two children, Ben and Amber, in addition to her becoming stepmother to his first child, Zeke. Both Ben and Zeke were diagnosed with cerebral palsy, and Amber with epilepsy. In July 2014, Neil filed for divorce in California.

Young died of cancer on January 1, 2019, aged 66, in Mountain View, California—just a few miles south of her birthplace in San Mateo.

Discography
 2007 – Pegi Young
 2010 – Foul Deeds
 2012 – Bracing for Impact (with The Survivors)
 2014 – Lonely in a Crowded Room (with The Survivors)
 2016 – Raw (with The Survivors)

Awards
 Induction into the San Mateo County Women's Hall of Fame, 1995
 Co-honored with Neil Young for their work with the Bridge School by Rock the Vote, 1999

References

External links
 
 The Bridge School
 Pegi Young | Discography & Songs | Discogs

1952 births
2019 deaths
People from San Mateo, California
American women singer-songwriters
Singer-songwriters from California
Philanthropists from California
Educators from California
American women educators
American folk guitarists
American folk singers
20th-century American guitarists
Guitarists from California
American acoustic guitarists
Deaths from cancer in California
20th-century American philanthropists
20th-century American women guitarists
21st-century American women
Neil Young